FK Jablonec is a Czech professional football club based in Jablonec nad Nisou. The club has played in the top league of Czech football, Czech First League, since 1994.

History
Jablonec played its first season of top league football in the 1974–75 Czechoslovak First League, remaining in the top league for two seasons before relegation in 1976. The club won the 1993–94 Czech 2. Liga and returned to the top league, now of the Czech Republic, in 1994. Jablonec finished third in the 1996–97 Czech First League, at the time its best-ever finish. As a result the club qualified for European competition in the form of the 1997–98 UEFA Cup, winning two and drawing two matches. The same season, the club won the Czech Cup, thus ensuring another season of European football, this time in the 1998–99 UEFA Cup Winners' Cup. The club reached the final of the 2006–07 Czech Cup, winning the right to play in European competition once more as opponents in the final and winners Sparta Prague qualified for the Champions League that season. As a result the club played in the second qualifying round of the 2007–08 UEFA Cup.

The club finished a best-ever second place in the 2009–10 Czech First League, just a point behind league champions Sparta Prague and qualified for the 2010–11 UEFA Europa League. 2010–11 saw Jablonec striker David Lafata finish as the league's top scorer with 19 goals, helping the team to a third-place finish and qualification for another season of European football. In 2011–12, Lafata set a new scoring record in the Czech First League as he scored an unprecedented 25 goals in a single season again being the league's top scorer, although the club finished eighth. Lafata would go on to score 13 goals in 16 league appearances for Jablonec in the first half of the 2012–13 season before signing for Sparta Prague.

Historical names
1945 — ČSK Jablonec nad Nisou (Český sportovní klub Jablonec nad Nisou)
1948 — SK Jablonec nad Nisou (Sportovní klub Jablonec nad Nisou)
1955 — Sokol Preciosa Jablonec nad Nisou
1960 — TJ Jiskra Jablonec nad Nisou (Tělovýchovná jednota Jiskra Jablonec nad Nisou)
1963 — TJ LIAZ Jablonec nad Nisou (Tělovýchovná jednota Liberecké automobilové závody Jablonec nad Nisou)
1993 — TJ Sklobižu Jablonec nad Nisou (Tělovýchovná jednota Sklobižu Jablonec nad Nisou)
1994 — FK Jablonec nad Nisou (Fotbalový klub Jablonec nad Nisou, a.s.)
1998 — FK Jablonec 97 (Fotbalový klub Jablonec 97, a.s.)
2008 — FK Baumit Jablonec (Fotbalový klub BAUMIT Jablonec, a.s.)
2015 — FK Jablonec (Fotbalový Klub Jablonec, a.s.)

Players

Current squad
.

Out on loan

Notable former players

Player records in the Czech First League
.
Highlighted players are in the current squad.

Most appearances

Most goals

Most clean sheets

Managers

 Jiří Kotrba (1993)
 Josef Pešice (1993–95)
 Jiří Kotrba (1995–98)
 Jaroslav Dočkal (1998)
 Július Bielik (1999)
 Zdeněk Klucký (1999–2000)
 Jindřich Dejmal (2000)
 Jaroslav Hřebík (2000–01)
 Vlastimil Palička (2001–03)
 Petr Rada (Oct 2003 – June 2007)
 Luboš Kozel (2007)
 František Komňacký (Oct 2007 – June 2012)
 Václav Kotal (July 2012 – May 2013)
 Roman Skuhravý (May 2013 – May 2014)
 Jaroslav Šilhavý (June 2014 – Dec 2015)
 Zdenko Frťala (Dec 2015 – Oct 2016)
 Zdeněk Klucký (Oct 2016 – Dec 2017)
 Petr Rada (Dec 2017 – April 2022)
 Jiří Vágner (April 2022 – May 2022)
 David Horejš (May 2022 – )

History in domestic competitions

 Seasons spent at Level 1 of the football league system: 27
 Seasons spent at Level 2 of the football league system: 1
 Seasons spent at Level 3 of the football league system: 0
 Seasons spent at Level 4 of the football league system: 0

Czech Republic

History in European competitions

Honours
Czech Cup
Winners: 1997–98, 2012–13
Runners-up (6): 2002–03, 2006–07, 2009–10, 2014–15, 2015–16, 2017–18
Czech Supercup
Winners: 2013
Czech 2. Liga (second tier)
Champions: 1993–94

Club records

Czech First League records
Best position: 2nd (2009–10)
Worst position: 14th (1999–2000)
Biggest home win: Jablonec 8–0 České Budějovice (1997–98)
Biggest away win: Příbram 0–6 Jablonec (2018–19)
Biggest home defeat: Jablonec 0–3 Sparta Prague (1998–99, 2000–01, 2017–18), Jablonec 0–3 Liberec (2001–02), Jablonec 0–3 Zlín (2007–08), Jablonec 1–4 Dukla Prague (2013–14), Jablonec 0–3 Mladá Boleslav (2018–19)
Biggest away defeat: Sparta Prague 6–0 Jablonec (1996–97)

References

External links

 

 
Football clubs in the Czech Republic
Association football clubs established in 1945
Czechoslovak First League clubs
Czech First League clubs
1945 establishments in Czechoslovakia